The Kamloops Daily News, also known as simply The Daily News was a local daily newspaper in Kamloops, British Columbia, Canada. It was owned by Glacier Media.

The paper was founded in 1931 as the Kamloops Shopper by George Duncan Brown. George Dawson and Watt Francis took the paper over in 1937 and called it the Kamloops Advertiser. In 1963 news items were included with paper's content. The paper's name was changed in 1965 to the North Kamloops News Advertiser. A year later it was changed to Kamloops News Advertiser. By 1968 the paper was published twice a week and three times a week two months later. The word "Advertiser" was dropped from the title in 1973. The paper was published Monday to Friday in 1982. By 1986 the paper was published six days a week and the name changed to The Kamloops Daily News. Later in 1995 the paper was delivered in the morning to residents of Kamloops.

Along with several other small British Columbia dailies, The Kamloops Daily News was one of the last Canadian properties to be held by Hollinger Inc., the media conglomerate owned by Conrad Black. Hollinger sold its remaining Canadian holdings to Vancouver-based Glacier Ventures International, later called Glacier Media, in 2006.

On January 6, 2014, the Daily News announced its closure within 60 days, citing economic reasons.

See also
List of newspapers in Canada

References

Mass media in Kamloops
Publications established in 1931
Publications disestablished in 2014
1931 establishments in British Columbia
Daily newspapers published in British Columbia